The 2009 Thuringian state election was held on 30 August 2009 to elect the members of the 5th Landtag of Thuringia. It was held on the same day as the 2009 Saarland state election and the 2009 Saxony state election. The incumbent Christian Democratic Union (CDU) government led by Minister-President Dieter Althaus was defeated. The CDU subsequently formed a grand coalition with the Social Democratic Party (SPD). Althaus resigned after the election due to his party's poor performance, which was far below expectations. He was succeeded by fellow CDU member Christine Lieberknecht, who was elected as the new Minister-President.

Parties
The table below lists parties represented in the 4th Landtag of Thuringia.

Opinion polling

Election result

|-
! colspan="2" | Party
! Votes
! %
! +/-
! Seats 
! +/-
! Seats %
|-
| bgcolor=| 
| align=left | Christian Democratic Union (CDU)
| align=right| 329,302
| align=right| 31.2
| align=right| 11.8
| align=right| 30
| align=right| 15
| align=right| 34.1
|-
| bgcolor=| 
| align=left | The Left (Linke)
| align=right| 288,915
| align=right| 27.4
| align=right| 1.3
| align=right| 28
| align=right| 1
| align=right| 30.7
|-
| bgcolor=| 
| align=left | Social Democratic Party (SPD)
| align=right| 195,363
| align=right| 18.5
| align=right| 4.0
| align=right| 18
| align=right| 3
| align=right| 20.5
|-
| bgcolor=| 
| align=left | Free Democratic Party (FDP)
| align=right| 80,600
| align=right| 7.6
| align=right| 4.0
| align=right| 7
| align=right| 7
| align=right| 8.0
|-
| bgcolor=| 
| align=left | Alliance 90/The Greens (Grüne)
| align=right| 64,912
| align=right| 6.2
| align=right| 1.7
| align=right| 6
| align=right| 6
| align=right| 6.8
|-
! colspan=8|
|-
| bgcolor=| 
| align=left | National Democratic Party (NPD)
| align=right| 45,451
| align=right| 4.3
| align=right| 2.7
| align=right| 0
| align=right| ±0
| align=right| 0
|-
| bgcolor=| 
| align=left | Free Voters (FW)
| align=right| 40,811
| align=right| 3.9
| align=right| 1.3
| align=right| 0
| align=right| ±0
| align=right| 0
|-
| bgcolor=|
| align=left | Others
| align=right| 8,943
| align=right| 0.8
| align=right| 
| align=right| 0
| align=right| ±0
| align=right| 0
|-
! align=right colspan=2| Total
! align=right| 1,054,297
! align=right| 100.0
! align=right| 
! align=right| 88
! align=right| ±0
! align=right| 
|-
! align=right colspan=2| Voter turnout
! align=right| 
! align=right| 56.2
! align=right| 2.4
! align=right| 
! align=right| 
! align=right| 
|}

Outcome
Minister-President and CDU leader Dieter Althaus resigned in the wake of the election, stating he took responsibility for his party's losses. However, observers noted that his resignation also helped clear the way for a grand coalition between the CDU and SPD, which was preferred by both parties, and would be easier to manage under new leadership. The only viable alternative to a grand coalition was a government led by The Left with SPD and Green support, which both the CDU and SPD sought to avoid; the CDU because such a coalition would leave them in opposition, and the SPD because of personal animosity between its leader Christoph Matschie and Left leader Bodo Ramelow. Ultimately, a grand coalition of the CDU and SPD was formed under the leadership of the CDU's Christine Lieberknecht, who was elected Minister-President.

Notes

References

2009
2009 elections in Germany